Dirt Music is a 2019 romantic drama film directed by Gregor Jordan, based on the 2001 novel of the same name by Tim Winton. It stars Garrett Hedlund, Kelly Macdonald, and David Wenham.

The film premiered at the Toronto International Film Festival on 11 September 2019. It was released in Australia on 8 October 2020 by Universal Pictures.

Premise

A poacher is chased through the Australian outback after his affair with a woman is discovered.

Cast
 Garrett Hedlund as Luther Fox
 Kelly Macdonald as Georgie Jutland
 David Wenham as Jim Buckridge
 Julia Stone as Sal
 Ava Caryofyllis as Bird
 Aaron Pedersen as Beaver
 Chris Haywood as Warwick
 George Mason as Darkie
 Daniel Wyllie as Rusty

Production
It was announced in August 2018 that Garrett Hedlund and Kelly Macdonald were cast to star in the adaptation of Tim Winton's novel. In October, the supporting cast, including David Wenham, was added, with filming beginning in Kimberley, Western Australia, and would also film in Perth and Esperance.

Reception
Dirt Music received generally negative reviews from critics. The website's critics consensus reads: "As beautifully filmed as it is emotionally hollow, Dirt Music goes digging for romance but only buries the audience in mounds of melodrama." Film reviewer, Luke Buckmaster, referred to it as an "only intermittently engaging film".

References

External links
 

2019 films
2019 romantic drama films
Australian romantic drama films
British romantic drama films
Films based on Australian novels
Films directed by Gregor Jordan
Films set in Western Australia
Films shot in Perth, Western Australia
Films with screenplays by Jack Thorne
Screen Australia films
Universal Pictures films
2010s British films